SS. Evnuvios, Paisios and Averikios were Eastern Orthodox monks from the Macedonian town of Kičevo who suffered martyrdom in the Immaculate Mother of God Monastery while protecting the Christian religion from the Ottoman army. They are the first saints that were canonized by the new Macedonian Orthodox Church, the canonization took place in the monastery where they died on the 2 August 2012.

16th-century Christian saints
Macedonian Orthodox Church
1558 deaths
Year of birth unknown